Əlibəyli (also, Alibeyli) is a village and municipality in the Zardab Rayon of Azerbaijan.  It has a population of 917.

References 

Populated places in Zardab District